Youth & Consequences is an American comedy-drama streaming television series created by Jason Ubaldi and starring Anna Akana, Sean Grandillo, and Piper Curda. It premiered on March 7, 2018, on YouTube Red. Executive producers included Ubaldi and Akana, alongside Mark Gordon, Nick Pepper, Blair Singer, Tom Spriggs, and Jesse Hara. On June 30, 2018, it was confirmed that the series would not return for a second season.

Premise
Youth & Consequences follows "powerful teen trendsetter Farrah Cutney, who is the queen of Central Rochester High struggling to keep her place in the firmament of power as rivals rise all around her".

Cast and characters

Main

 Anna Akana as Farrah Cutney
 Sean Grandillo as Colin Cowher
 Katie Sarife as Sara Hurley
 Sophie Reynolds as Plain Jane
 Kara Royster as Jayne
 Savannah Jayde as Stacey Moorehead
 Piper Curda as Grace Ho

Recurring

 Mike Gray as Ilo Hampton
 Moses Storm as Hook
 Marcia Cross as Principal Cowher
 Sumalee Montano as Kate Cutney
 Brando White as Will
 Ashley Parker as Hannah
 Karan Brar as Dipankar Gosh
 Abigail Snarr as Kendra
 Melanie Nelson as Superintendent Moorehead
 Allie Rae Treharne as Hope
 Jennifer Grzybowski as Lynn
 Austin Grant as Tripp
 Cary Elwes as Joel Cutney
 Gabriel Eckert as Gabe
 Tristan B. Johnson as Jack
 Darien Willardson as Brandon Swain

Episodes

Production

Development
On October 18, 2017, it was announced that YouTube had given the production a series order to consist of a first season of eight half hour episodes. Anna Akana and Jason Ubaldi began developing the series with YouTube in January 2017 through its partnership with the Sundance Institute. Ubaldi created and wrote the series, with Akana serving as an executive producer. The Mark Gordon Company is producing the show, with Gordon signed on to executive produce alongside Nick Pepper, Blair Singer, Tom Spriggs, and Jesse Hara. Singer will serve as the series' showrunner and Wendey Stanzler is set to direct the pilot episode. On June 30, 2018, series lead Anna Akana confirmed on her Twitter account that the series would not return for a second season.

Casting
Alongside the initial series announcement, it was reported that Akana would play the series' lead role of Farrah Cutney. Other actors set for the main cast include Sean Grandillo, Katie Sarife, Kara Royster, Sophie Reynolds, Piper Curda, and Savannah Jayde. It was also announced that Marcia Cross would join the cast in a recurring capacity and Cary Elwes would appear in a guest role. On December 19, 2017, it was announced that Moses Storm had joined the series in the recurring role of Hook.

Filming
Production for the first season took place in Ogden, Utah between August and September 2017. Scenes taking place at school were filmed at Ogden High School. It was reported that if further seasons of the show were produced then filming would occur at the school during summer months only.

The Ogden School District received $67,500 for letting the production film at Ogden High School. The payment was set to be split, with $37,500 going to the district and the rest going directly to the high school.

Music
The series' score was composed by husband-wife composing duo Waz and Jamie Jackson, known as WAZ-Jackson. The pair spent three months working on the show from October to December 2017. The composers have mentioned how showrunner Jason Ubaldi managed to create characters with multiple dimensions. Wanting to reflect that, Waz and Jackson decided to write the score in such a manner as to support all of those layers through an array of different musical genres. Given that much of the show takes place in a high school, they used the driving energy of a marching band drumline to keep the momentum going from scene to scene. They also used modern electronic percussion, vibes, and mellotron to keep the show's sound youthful and quirky. When heartfelt moments would occur in the storyline, they were supported by ethereal piano, synth, and electric guitar pieces. Unlike other series that WAZ-Jackson have scored, Youth & Consequences was ordered straight-to-series. This meant that while they were developing the overall musical sound for the show in the pilot episode, they were also sent episodes 102 and 103 as well. Given that the composing process for the show was moving at such a rapid pace the duo brought Al Sgro on board to help with the score.

Release

Marketing
On January 13, 2018, the series' producers appeared at the annual Television Critics Association's winter press tour during a panel discussion of the show. Akana was reported as having said, "I think the thing that drew me to the script the most was that her motivations to the audience are never really clear. Jason did a beautiful job of using the Mean Girls construct for you to kind of wonder, 'Is she self-serving or is she actually serving an agenda that's for other people?' I think that's the beauty of the complexity in a high school story — is that people's motivations aren't necessarily purely selfish or purely for someone else."

On February 7, 2018, YouTube released the first clip from the series and a collection of still images. A few days later on February 12, the series' first teaser trailer was released and a few days after that YouTube released the full-length trailer and announced a premiere date of March 7, 2018.

Premiere
On February 28, 2018, the series held a screening event in Los Angeles, California.

Reception

Critical response
In a positive review, Common Sense Medias Joyce Slaton praised the series saying, "Circling around a power-hungry school clique, this teen dramedy is intriguing, mean-spirited and entertaining all at once." She went on to say, "The unkindness and less-than-positive messages may convince parents to keep this one on the do-not-watch list. But as a sort of dark high school-set Dangerous Liaisons, Youth & Consequences hits the mark and may soon make converts of new viewers. "

Awards and nominations

References

External links
 

2010s American comedy-drama television series
2010s American teen drama television series
English-language television shows
2018 American television series debuts
2018 American television series endings
YouTube Premium original series
American teen comedy-drama web series
Television series about teenagers